Moritz Leitner (born 8 December 1992) is a German professional footballer who plays as a midfielder. He has also previously played for Borussia Dortmund, 1860 Munich, FC Augsburg, Lazio and Norwich City. He has been capped at youth international level by Germany and Austria.

Club career

1860 Munich

Born in Munich, Leitner started his football career at FC Unterföhring, joining them at the age of two. As a six-year-old, he moved to 1860 Munich.

Leitner made his professional debut for his childhood club 1860 Munich on 14 August 2010, coming on as a substitute for Aleksandar Ignjovski in a DFB-Pokal match against SC Verl, setting up an equaliser for Stefan Aigner. By the end of 2010, Leitner had made eighteen appearances in all competitions. Prior to his departure in January, his form dipped and he was often relegated to the substitute bench.

Borussia Dortmund
In October 2010, it was announced that Leitner would move to Borussia Dortmund when the transfer window opened in January 2011. He signed a four-year contract with the club, keeping him there until 2015.

Leitner immediately joined FC Augsburg on loan. When his loan spell at Augsburg came to an end, he returned to Borussia Dortmund and was given the number seven shirt. Having been an unused substitute from the start of the season, he made his Borusssia Dortmund debut on 24 September 2011, coming on as a second-half substitute in a 2–1 win over Mainz 05. Leitner made a handful of first team appearances between 22 October 2011 and 26 November 2011, when he suffered a back injury that kept him out throughout 2012. On 22 January 2012, he made his return to the first team, setting up a goal in a 5–1 win over Hamburger SV. Although he suffered another injury later in the season, Leitner made 22 appearances in his first season although, because of competition in the playmaker position, only four as a starter in the 2011–12 season. In those 22 games, he made two assists.

Leitner made his first start of the 2012–13 season in a 2–1 loss against Bayern Munich in the DFL-Supercup. After the departure of Shinji Kagawa, he received more game time, making 30 appearances. Due to the impressive performances of Mario Götze, however, only ten of these were as a starter and he spent most of the 2012–13 season on the substitutes bench. He appeared as an unused substitute in the UEFA Champions League Final against Bayern Munich. He made three assists with no goals scored. Leitner hinted at leaving Borussia Dortmund to get first team football in the 2013–14 season.

After two seasons on loan at Stuttgart, Leitner's future at Borussia Dortmund became uncertain following the arrival of Thomas Tuchel. In the first half of the season, he played for the club's reserve side. His first appearance came on 1 October 2015 - a 1–1 draw against PAOK in the UEFA Europa League. In second half of the season Leitner played for the first team due to an injury crisis. He went on to make twelve appearances in all competitions.

Loan to Augsburg
Shortly after joining Borussia Dortmund, Leitner joined FC Augsburg on loan until the end of the 2010–11 season in January 2011.

He made his Augsburg debut in a 2–0 win over Ingolstadt 04 on 16 January 2011, setting up one goal. After being sidelined with an elbow injury, Leitner made 9 appearances for the club.

Loan to Stuttgart

On 1 July 2013, Moritz Leitner joined VfB Stuttgart on loan until June 2015.

He made his Stuttgart debut in their first game of the Bundesliga season in a 3–2 loss against Mainz 05. He suffered a knee injury in training in September 2013. He returned to the first team on 1 November 2013, playing against his parent club in a 6–1 loss. On 1 February 2014, Leitner scored his first Bundesliga goal in Stuttgart's 2–1 defeat to Bayer Leverkusen. He was sent off for a second bookable offence in a 4–1 loss against 1899 Hoffenheim on 15 February 2014. Having suffered injuries throughout the season, Leitner finished his first season with Stuttgart with 24 appearances and one goal in all competitions.

In his second season at Stuttgart, Leitner continued to be a first team regular. He scored his first goal of the season in a 3–2 loss against Hertha BSC on 3 October 2014. During a 3–3 draw against Bayer 04 Leverkusen on 18 October 2014, Leitner suffered a thigh injury and was sidelined as a result. As the 2014–15 season progressed, his first team opportunities came under threat when he fell out with manager Huub Stevens, resulting in Leitner being dropped from the first team. Leitner was also demoted to the reserve side for the rest of the season. He made 20 appearances and scored once in all competitions.

Just before the end of the season, it was announced that Leitner would return to his parent club when the 2014–15 season ended.

Lazio
On 12 August 2016, Lazio signed Leitner from Borussia Dortmund for a fee of €1.5 million. He was signed to replace Ogenyi Onazi, who had joined Turkish Süper Lig club Trabzonspor.

On 1 October 2016 he made his Lazio debut, coming on as a late substitute in a 3–0 win over Udinese. Leitner made another appearance on 26 October 2016 in a 4–1 win over Cagliari. Leitner spent the first half of the season on the bench. He made two appearances for Lazio.

FC Augsburg
On 31 January 2017, Leitner was signed by Bundesliga side FC Augsburg on a four-year deal for a reported fee of €2 million. Upon joining the club, he was given the number five shirt.

Leitner did not appear in the first team immediately, due to issues in adapting to the club's playing style. On 17 February 2017, he made his second debut for Augsburg in a 3–1 loss against Bayer 04 Leverkusen. Leitner made his first start on 12 March 2017 in a 3–0 loss against Schalke 04. He made six appearances for the club in the 2016–17 season.

Norwich City
Having failed to make an appearance in the first half of the 2017–18 season, Leitner was loaned to EFL Championship side Norwich City on 25 January 2018 for six months. His debut for Norwich City was as a substitute in a 0–1 win over Brentford on 27 January 2018. On 26 June 2018, Leitner joined the club permanently on a four-year deal for an undisclosed fee. He scored the equaliser in the first East Anglian derby of the 2018–19 season, the game finishing 1–1. With Norwich, he won promotion to the Premier League in the 2018–19 season. Afterwards, he fell out of favour and only made nine appearances in the top flight, as the club suffered relegation after one season. Despite this, Leitner remained out of the squad and made no appearances as the Canaries secured another Championship title for the 2020–21 season.

Zürich
On 7 August 2021, Leitner signed a one-year contract with Swiss Super League club Zürich. On 21 May 2022, Zürich announced that Leitner's contract will not be extended.

International career
Having made one appearance for Austria U17 - against Estonia U17 on 21 May 2008, a 7–0 win - Leitner appeared to switch nationality.

In September 2010, Leitner received German citizenship, making him eligible to play for Germany. He made his debut for the U19 national side in a 3–0 win over Denmark U19. Leitner scored two goals in a 10–0 win over Andorra U19 on 8 October 2010 and another in a 2–1 win over Northern Ireland U19 three days later. He later went on to score four more goals for the German U19s, including one in a 5–0 win over Macedonia U19.

Leitner made his debut for Germany U21 in a 4–1 win over Cyprus U21 on 9 August 2011. Leitner scored his first Germany U21 goal on 10 October 2011 in an 8–0 win over San Marino U21. He captained the team three times. Leitner was also included in the UEFA European Under-21 Championship squad, playing once in the tournament.

In March 2013, Leitner was called up by Germany U20. He scored in both legs against Switzerland U21.

Personal life
Leitner's father, Erwin Feldberger (born 1943), comes from the Baden-Württemberg town of Burladingen. His mother comes from Austria. His father was also a footballer. Leitner is one of two children and grew up in the suburb of Oberföhring.

Career statistics

Honours
Borussia Dortmund
Bundesliga: 2011–12
DFB-Pokal: 2011–12
UEFA Champions League runner-up: 2012–13

Norwich City
EFL Championship: 2018–19, 2020–21

References

External links

1992 births
Living people
Footballers from Munich
German people of Austrian descent
German footballers
Austrian footballers
Association football midfielders
Austria youth international footballers
Germany youth international footballers
Germany under-21 international footballers
Bundesliga players
2. Bundesliga players
3. Liga players
English Football League players
Premier League players
Serie A players
Swiss Super League players
TSV 1860 Munich players
FC Augsburg players
Borussia Dortmund players
VfB Stuttgart players
S.S. Lazio players
Norwich City F.C. players
FC Zürich players
German expatriate footballers
German expatriate sportspeople in Italy
Expatriate footballers in Italy
German expatriate sportspeople in England
Expatriate footballers in England
German expatriate sportspeople in Switzerland
Expatriate footballers in Switzerland